Jokapeci Talei Koroi (1932 – 12 July 2011) was a Fijian politician.  She served as the President of the Fiji Labour Party  and a Senator.  She was appointed to the Senate in 2002 as one of 8 nominees of the Leader of the Opposition, Mahendra Chaudhry.

References

Fiji Labour Party politicians
1932 births
2011 deaths
I-Taukei Fijian members of the Senate (Fiji)
I-Taukei Fijian people